Kramar is a surname. Notable people with the surname include:

Anton Kramar (born 1988), Ukrainian footballer
Denis Kramar (born 1991), Slovenian footballer
Frantisek Kramar (1759–1831), Czech composer
Karel Kramář (1860–1937), Czech politician
Urban Kramar (born 1990), Slovenian footballer
Vladimir Kramar (born 1993), Russian ice hockey goaltender

See also 
Kramář's Villa, is the official residence of the Prime Minister of the Czech Republic